Denison may refer to:

People 
Denison (name)

Places 
Denison, Iowa
Denison, Kansas
Denison, Texas, birthplace of Dwight D. Eisenhower
Denison, Washington
Denison University, in Granville, Ohio
 the English name for Kosinj, a valley and region in Croatia

Other uses 
Division of Denison, an Australian federal electoral division
Division of Denison (state), a former Tasmanian electoral division
Denison Mines, a Canadian mining company
Denison smock, a combat jacket

See also
Saint Denis of Paris (3rd-century–250), Christian martyr and saint
Dennison (disambiguation)